Machine Vision and Applications is a bimonthly peer-reviewed scientific journal covering image processing. It was established in 1988 and is published by Springer Science+Business Media. The editor-in-chief is Mubarak Shah (University of Central Florida). According to the Journal Citation Reports, the journal has a 2012 impact factor of 1.103.

References

External links 
 

Publications established in 1988
Springer Science+Business Media academic journals
English-language journals
Bimonthly journals
Computer science journals